Nebria quezeli is a species of ground beetle in the Nebriinae subfamily that is endemic to northern part of Morocco.

References

quezeli
Beetles described in 1953
Beetles of North Africa
Endemic fauna of Morocco